Víctor Hugo Guglielmotti Tobosque (born 24 December 1975) is a Chilean former footballer who played as a left-back for clubs in Chile and Sweden.

Career
A left-back from the Everton de Viña del Mar youth system, Guglielmotti made appearances in the Chilean Primera División in 1995 and 2000, staying with them until 2001.

In 2007, he emigrated to Sweden and joined Valsta Syrianska IK, moving to Syrianska FC in the next season, making twenty one appearances for them at league level. As a member of Syrianska FC, he won the league title of the Division 1 Norra in 2008, getting promotion to the Superettan.

He officially retired in 2011.

Personal life
Guglielmotti made his home in Sweden and has worked for Dafo Brand, a company of fire and rescue systems.

Following his retirement, he went on playing football at amateur level for Rapa Nui FK, serving after as head of the club. He also has kept a friendship with another Chilean footballers in Sweden such as Cristián González and Jonatan Almendra.

Honours
Syrianska FC
 Division 1 Norra: 2008

References

External links
 
 
 
 Víctor Guglielmotti at FootballDatabase.eu

1975 births
Living people
Chilean people of Italian descent
Chilean footballers
Chilean expatriate footballers
Chilean Primera División players
Primera B de Chile players
Everton de Viña del Mar footballers
Ettan Fotboll players
Superettan players
Syrianska FC players
Chilean expatriate sportspeople in Sweden
Expatriate footballers in Sweden
Association football defenders
Place of birth missing (living people)